Jiří Stivín (born 23 November 1942 in Prague) is a Czech flute player and composer.

Biography
He graduated from the Film Faculty of the Academy of Performing Arts in Prague (FAMU). He also studied composition at the Royal Academy of Music as well as at the Prague Academy of Music (AMU), and studied the flute under Milan Munclinger.

Stivín performs music from the Middle Ages, the Renaissance, and the Baroque periods. As a sololist, he performed with the Prague Symphony Orchestra, with the Slovak Chamber Orchestra, with Suk Chamber Orchestra, Barocco sempre giovane as well as with several other ensembles. He is also involved in jazz, both as a performer and as a composer. He gives regular lectures at the Prague Conservatory.

Stivín is active in the Jazz Quartet in the Czech Republic, playing both the flute and saxophone. His large discography ranges from jazz to classical music.

His daughter Zuzana Stivínová is an actress.

References

External links
Official site
Review in French of the record Coniunctio with Blue Effect, Jazz Q Praha & Jiri Stivin on www.sefronia.com
 (list of film music compositions)

1942 births
Living people
Alumni of the Royal Academy of Music
Czech classical musicians
Czech classical flautists
Czech jazz musicians
Czech saxophonists
Musicians from Prague
Recipients of Medal of Merit (Czech Republic)
European Jazz Ensemble members